Bodenheim is a Verbandsgemeinde ("collective municipality") in the district Mainz-Bingen in Rhineland-Palatinate, Germany. The seat of the Verbandsgemeinde is in Bodenheim.

The Verbandsgemeinde Bodenheim consists of the following Ortsgemeinden ("local municipalities"):

 Bodenheim
 Gau-Bischofsheim
 Harxheim
 Lörzweiler 
 Nackenheim

Verbandsgemeinde in Rhineland-Palatinate